Pseudobithynia renei is a species of freshwater snail with a gill and an operculum, an aquatic gastropod mollusk in the family Bithyniidae.

Distribution 
The distribution of this species includes:
 Greece

The type locality is (in French language) "Marais de Cressida près Corfou", Corfu, Greece.

Description 
The width of the shell is 4 mm. The height of the shell is 6 mm.

References

External links 
 Locard A. (1894). "Les Bythinia du système européen. Revision des espèces appartenant à ce genre d’après la collection BOURGUIGNAT". Revue suisse de Zoologie 2(1): 65-134, plates 5–6. Page 89, plate VI, fig. 19.

Bithyniidae
Gastropods described in 1887